Katharina Düll (born 9 April 1973) is a German former professional tennis player.

Düll was a member of West Germany's World Youth Cup (Junior Fed Cup) winning team in 1989. On the professional tour, she reached a career high singles ranking of 225 in the world. She made the second round of the 1987 Argentine Open in Buenos Aires and 1989 Citizen Cup in Hamburg.

References

External links
 
 

1973 births
Living people
West German female tennis players
German female tennis players